Oluyemi is a Nigerian masculine given name of Yoruba origin meaning  "God has given me satisfaction".
Notable people with the name includes:

Oluyemi Adeniji (1934–2017), Nigerian career diplomat and politician
Abel Oluyemi Ajibodu, Anglican bishop in Nigeria
Oluyemi Fagbamila (born 1983), retired Nigerian sprinter 
Oluyemi Kayode (1968–1994), Nigerian sprinter
Oluyemi Osinbajo (born 1957), Nigerian lawyer, professor, and politician
Oluyemi Thomas (born 1952), American jazz bass clarinetist

References

Yoruba masculine given names